The National Building Museum promotes excellence in architecture, engineering, construction, planning, and design. In furtherance of that mission, the Museum instituted an annual Honor Award in 1986 to recognize individuals and organizations that have made important contributions to the U.S.'s building heritage. Recipients are selected from a wide variety of backgrounds to call attention to the many factors that determine the form and quality of the built world.
Past recipients include ex-First Lady Lady Bird Johnson, who was honored in 1995 for her lifetime leadership in beautification and conservation campaigns. Michael Eisner and The Walt Disney Company were honored in 2001 in recognition of their commitment to architecture, commissioning postmodernist architects such as Michael Graves, Robert A.M. Stern, Frank Gehry, and Arata Isozaki. In 2010, Perkins and Will became the first architecture firm ever to receive the prize for "designing buildings that promote the health of occupants, conserve resources, and unify communities," in the words of Museum executive director Chase W. Rynd.
The National Building Museum also bestows two other major awards: the Vincent Scully Prize to recognize exemplary practice, scholarship, or criticism in architecture, historic preservation, and urban design and the Henry C. Turner Prize for Innovation in Construction Technology.

List of Honor Award Winners

References

External links 
 Honor Awards on nbm.org
 Chicago Tribune feature on Mayor Daley's award
 EcoHome article on Rick Fedrizzi's award

Architecture awards